Hazelwood is a hamlet in Greater London, England. It is located within the London Borough of Bromley, to the east of Downe.

References

Districts of the London Borough of Bromley
Hamlets in the London Borough of Bromley